Thomas Mycock (22 August 1923 – 17 June 1988) was an English professional footballer who played as a wing half in the Football League for Tranmere Rovers, Bradford City, Southport and Aldershot.

Career statistics

References

Tranmere Rovers F.C. players
Brentford F.C. players
Aldershot F.C. players
Bradford City A.F.C. players
Southport F.C. players
Lisburn Distillery F.C. players
Swansea City A.F.C. players
New Brighton A.F.C. players
English Football League players
Association football wing halves
1923 births
1988 deaths
Irish League representative players
English footballers